This is a list of the tallest structures in Turkmenistan. This list contains all tower, buildings and other structures in Turkmenistan based on standard height.

Tallest structures
This list ranks the structures in Turkmenistan that stand at least 90 m (295 ft). Only completed buildings and structured are included.

See also
 List of tallest structures in Central Asia
 List of tallest structures in the former Soviet Union

References

Tallest structures
Turkmenistan